The wrestling competition at the 2022 Mediterranean Games was held from 26 to 29 June at the EMEC Hall in Oran. The men's greco-Roman style 97 kg events were removed from the program because there was not enough participation. Albania, Algeria and San Marino won their first gold medals in the Wrestling at the Mediterranean Games.

Competition schedule
All times are (UTC+1)

Medal table

Medalists

Men's freestyle

Men's Greco-Roman

Women's freestyle

Participating nations
139 wrestlers from 19 countries:

References

External links
Official site
Results book

Wrestling
2022
Mediterranean